Jargalant ("Happiness") is a sum (district) of Arkhangai Province in central Mongolia. In 2009, its population was 4,111.

References 

Populated places in Mongolia
Districts of Arkhangai Province